In Spite of Thunder, first published in 1960, is a detective story by John Dickson Carr which features Carr's series detective Gideon Fell.  This novel is a mystery of the type known as a locked room mystery (or more accurately a subset of that type known as an "impossible crime").

Plot summary

Beautiful film star Eve Eden's fiancé Hector Matthews died in a strange accident while the couple was visiting Adolf Hitler at Berchtesgaden in 1939. Although he had no reason to commit suicide, he apparently flung himself off a high balcony to die hundreds of feet below—and no one was near him at the time, as the witnesses Gerald Hathaway and Paula Catford say. Years later, Eve is married to actor Desmond Ferrier and living in Geneva. Brian Innes, a painter who lives in Geneva too, is asked by his old school friend DeForrest Page to warn his daughter Audrey against continuing to associate with Eve. When Eve Ferrier appears at the Hotel du Rhône, where Innes had been dining with Sir Gerald Hathaway, she proves to be carrying a perfume bottle filled with oil of vitriol, apparently to her own surprise. The next day, when Innes is called to Eve Ferrier's villa by a desperate Audrey, he arrives in time to see Eve fall to her death from a high balcony—and no one was near her at the time. It takes the investigative genius of Gideon Fell to penetrate the ingenious murder method and reveal the criminal.

1960 American novels
Novels by John Dickson Carr
Locked-room mysteries
Novels set in Switzerland
Fiction set in 1939
Novels about actors
Hamish Hamilton books
Harper & Brothers books